At the 1999 Pan Arab Games, the athletics events were held at the Prince Hasan Youth City Stadium in the Al Hasan Sport City Complex in Irbid, Jordan from 11 to 14 August.

The athletics events were held before the official opening ceremony of the games on 18 August due to their proximity to the 1999 World Championships in Athletics, also held that month.

A total of 45 events were contested, of which 23 by male and 22 by female athletes (the men's programme featured a steeplechase event). The women's road events were shorter than the men's, having a half marathon compared to the men's marathon and a 10 km walk compared to a 20 km walk.

The competition was affected by the highest profile doping incident of the games. Siham Hanafi originally won three sprinting gold medals for Morocco, taking the women's 100 metres, 200 metres and 4×100 metres relay titles. She lost all three after testing positive for nandrolone (a banned steroid) and the Moroccan relay team was entirely disqualified. Discus throw bronze medallist Karima Shaheen, also of Morocco, was another athlete whose result was annulled due to a drug test failure, again for nandrolone.

The electronic timing system at the event failed during the competition and as a result some of the races were hand-timed. In the men's 110 metres hurdles fifteen-year-old Nassim Qarbani Ibrahim of Qatar ran a hand-timed 13.9 in the preliminary round before running an electronic 14.17 seconds as runner-up in the final – these were the best ever times for the event by an athlete his age.

Medal summary

Men

Women

 Morocco's Siham Hanafi was the initial winner in 11.48 seconds, before her disqualification for doping
 Morocco's Hanafi was the initial winner in 24.34 seconds, before her disqualification for doping
 Morocco was the initial winner in 46.89 seconds, before Hanafi's disqualification for doping  
 Morocco's Karima Shaheen was the initial bronze medallist with 49.91 metres, before her disqualification for doping

Medal table

See also
1999 Arab Athletics Championships

References

Results
Pan Arab Games champions. GBR Athletics. Retrieved on 2013-11-09.
Résultats des Jeux panarabes d'Amman . Al-Ahram. Retrieved on 2013-11-09.
IAAF 1999 Top Lists. IAAF. Retrieved on 2013-11-09.

1999 Pan Arab Games
Pan Arab Games
1999
International athletics competitions hosted by Jordan